Gangrene is an American musical duo consisting of rappers/producers The Alchemist and Oh No.

In 2013, Gangrene, together with Tangerine Dream and Woody Jackson scored and composed the original score for Grand Theft Auto V by Rockstar Games.

Discography
 Sawblade EP (2010)
 Gutter Water (2010)
 Greneberg (with Roc Marciano) (2011)
 Vodka & Ayahuasca (2012)
 Odditorium EP (2012)
 Welcome to Los Santos (2015)
 You Disgust Me (2015)

Singles and videoclips
 "The Sickness" (2010) - (from Sawblade EP)
 "Not High Enough" (2010) - (from Gutter Water)
 "Chain Swinging" (2010) - (from Gutter Water)
 "Take Drugs" (2010) - (from Gutter Water)
 "All Bad" (2010) - (from Gutter Water)
 "Dump Truck" (feat. Prodigy) (2011) - (from Vodka & Ayahuasca)
 "Vodka & Ayahuaska (2012) - (from Vodka & Ayahuasca)

References 

American musical duos
Hip hop duos
Hip hop groups from California
Record production teams
Musical groups established in 2010
Musicians from Beverly Hills, California
2010 establishments in California